The Industrial Vagina: The Political Economy of the Global Sex Trade is a 2008 book about prostitution and the sex industry by the political scientist Sheila Jeffreys. It received positive reviews, praising Jeffreys for covering many different aspects of the sex industry.

Summary

Jeffreys discusses prostitution and the sex industry. She writes that prostitution has become a "burgeoning and immensely profitable global market sector."

Publication history
The Industrial Vagina was published by Routledge in 2009.

Reception
The Industrial Vagina received positive reviews from the feminist Julie Bindel in The Guardian, Sarah Nelson in Women's Studies, A. K. in The Contemporary Review, and Mindy A. Menn in the Journal of Sex Research. The book was also reviewed by Natalie Purcell in Feminism & Psychology, Vidyamali Samarasinghe in Gender & Society, and Nicola J. Smith in the Review of International Political Economy, and discussed by Kate Holden in Meanjin.

Bindel wrote that, "The strength of Jeffreys' new work lies in just how many aspects of the sex industry she covers, and her understanding of their intersections". Nelson credited Jeffreys with demonstrating "the ways in which governments eager for revenue have decriminalized the sex trade" and concluded that her "provocative book ... should be devoured by any with an interest in gender, feminism, globalization, economy, sociology, cultural studies, and history." A. K. called the book "timely, shocking, and, sadly, necessary". Menn credited Jeffreys with discussing "the intricately intertwined facets of the global sex industry" more broadly than any other author, with "focusing on a broad spectrum of issues and incorporating empirical data from around the globe on each aspect of the industry", and with meticulously documenting the subject. She also praised Jeffreys's "unapologetic, radical feminist writing style".

References

Bibliography
Books

 

Journals

  
  
  
  
  
  
  

Online articles

 

2008 non-fiction books
Non-fiction books about prostitution
Books by Sheila Jeffreys
English-language books
Radical feminist books
Routledge books